The 1956 Tangerine Bowl was an American college football bowl game played after the 1955 season, on January 2, 1956, at the Tangerine Bowl stadium in Orlando, Florida.  The Juniata Indians  with a record of 8–0 faced the Missouri Valley Vikings with a record of 9–1. Juniata had outscored their regular season opponents 240–32 with 4 shutouts, and had a 23-game winning streak, while Missouri Valley had outscored their opponents 207–84 with 2 shutouts. The teams played to a 6–6 tie.

Game summary
All scoring took place in the first quarter, with each team scoring a touchdown via a passing play, and both teams missing their extra point attempts. Despite other scoring chances, including Juniata having two first-and-goal opportunities in the fourth quarter, the game ended in a 6–6 tie.

Scoring summary

Statistics

Notes
 Juniata head coach Robert C. Hicks was unrelated to Bob Hicks who was the head coach at Indiana in 1957. Robert C. Hicks later coached at DePauw and Wagner.
 Missouri Valley head coach Volney Ashford is an inductee of the College Football Hall of Fame.
 The undefeated 1955 Hillsdale College football team refused an invitation to the game when bowl officials insisted that Hillsdale's four African-American players would not be allowed to play in the game.

References

Tangerine Bowl
Citrus Bowl (game)
Juniata Eagles football
Missouri Valley Vikings football
Tangerine Bowl
Tangerine Bowl